Bowin Cars was an Australian designer and manufacturer of motor racing cars from 1968 to 1976. The company was founded by John Vincent Joyce (1938–2002), a successful designer and builder of racing cars and in later years gas appliances incorporating Low NOx Technology.

History

Approximately ten racing cars were sold for export to Canada, New Zealand and South East Asia. Bowin Cars have raced successfully in these countries as well as Europe.

Models
All Bowin Cars started with the letter P, which simply stood for project.

Earlier Models
In fact, two Formula Juniors were designed and built by John Joyce prior to the formation of Bowin Cars.
 (P1) - A Cooper-based car in 1959
 (P2) - The Koala in 1962.

Bowin Models
 Bowin P3 - 1967-1968 P3 Australian National Formula Car
 Bowin P4 - 1970-1974 P4 Formula Ford Car
 Bowin P6 - 1972-1974 P6 Formula Ford & Formula 2 Car
 Bowin P7 - 1973-1975 P7 ?
 Bowin P8 - 1973-1975 P8 Formula 2 & Formula 5000 Car

References

External links
 

 
Australian racecar constructors
Formula Two constructors